"One More Sleep" is a song recorded by British singer Leona Lewis for her first Christmas album and fourth studio album, Christmas, with Love (2013). It was written by Lewis in collaboration with Richard "Biff" Stannard, Iain James, Jez Ashurst and Bradford Ellis, and produced by Richard "Biff" Stannard. It was released in the United States on 5 November, in Ireland and the United Kingdom on 29 November and many parts of Europe on 2 December. "One More Sleep" is recognised as one of the biggest recent Christmas songs in the UK according to the Official Charts Company. The song is certified double platinum by the British Phonographic Industry (BPI). "One More Sleep" is also one of the most-streamed Christmas songs in the UK, with over 93 million streams as of 2021.

Background

In February 2013, a representative from Syco Music, Lewis' record label, announced that she was about to start writing and recording material "imminently" for her fourth studio album, and that it would be released in late 2013. The news came after Lewis announced that she had parted ways from Modest! Management, the management team who had represented her since she won the third series of The X Factor in 2006. Various media outlets speculated that this was due to the weak commercial performance of her third studio album, Glassheart, which was released in November 2012. It became her first album to not debut at number one or earn platinum certification in the United Kingdom. It was also reported that the second single from the album, "Lovebird", had sold fewer than 600 copies, meaning that it failed to attain one of 200 chart positions on the UK Singles Chart, and this was another contributing factor to her departure.

In June 2013, speculation arose that Lewis' fourth album would in fact be a Christmas album, after British production duo MagicIT tweeted that they were in a studio recording Christmas songs with the singer. The following month, Lewis confirmed that she was indeed in the process of recording a Christmas album. She revealed that it was recorded on the recommendation of Syco boss Simon Cowell. Speaking in July 2013 about the decision to record a Christmas album at this point in her career, Lewis further explained how Cowell had come up with the idea: "Simon is still very much involved in my career and helps me out. He came up with the Christmas album idea, and we both kind of felt it was the right time to go ahead with it."

Release
On 24 October 2013, Lewis unveiled "One More Sleep" as the album's lead single, and she released the single cover artwork a week later, on 31 October. The artwork is a head shot of Lewis holding a red bow over her eye. The song was released as a digital download in the United States on 5 November through RCA Records, Ireland, Italy and Switzerland through Sony Music Entertainment and the United Kingdom through Syco Music on 29 November, and multiple other European countries on 2 December, including France and Spain. Lewis uploaded a Cahill remix of the song to her official SoundCloud account on 21 November 2013.

Production and composition
"One More Sleep" was co-written by Lewis in collaboration with Richard "Biff" Stannard, Iain James, Jez Ashurst and Bradford Ellis. Stannard and Ash Howes produced the song, while they and Lewis carried out the vocal production. It was recorded by Biffco and mixed by Howes at Biffco Studios, Brighton, and Angel Recording Studios, London. The song utilised a multitude of instrumentalists: Keys and programming were performed by Ashurst, Stannard and Howes; Celli by Nick Holland; drums by Freddy Sheed and bass by Knight Time Horns; trombone by Barnaby Dickinson and trumpet by Graeme Flowers; James Knight performed the saxophone; strings were led by Rolf Wilson, arranged and conducted by Cliff Masterson and booked by Roz Colls; Rolf Wilson, Simon Baggs, Steve Morris, Julian Leaper, Tom Piggot Smith, Richard George, Jonathan Hill, Laura Bruce White, Tim Grant, Reiad Chibah performed the violins; and violas by Greg Walmsley, Nerys Richards. Background vocals were sung by Katie Holmes, Kelli-Leigh Henry-Davila and Bianca Claxton, while Choir vocals were performed by Diva singers, who were arranged and conducted by Masterson.

The hook consists of a Christmas countdown, whereby Lewis sings "Cause I got five more nights of sleeping on my own/ Four more days until you’re coming home/ Three more dreams of you and mistletoe/ Two more reasons why I love you so." Lewis "trills" the lyrics "I've got five more nights of sleeping on my own/ Four more days until you're coming home" over the Motown inspired beat of xylophone phones and jingle bells. Waiting the return of her partner to come home on Christmas Day, Lewis adopts an "angelic tone" as she sings "Three more dreams of you and mistletoe/ Two more reasons why I love you so." Popjustice praised the "5-4-3-2-1 device", calling it "excellent."

Critical reception
"One More Sleep" garnered acclaim from music critics. Writing for Digital Spy, Lewis Corner wrote that "One More Sleep" is more "heart-warming" and "sweet" than a Christmas pudding, and that is likely to become an annual Christmas staple song. He awarded the song four out of a possible five stars. Sam Lanksy of Idolator wrote that the song is "wonderfully old-fashioned", with "ooh-oohs" sung in the background and "twinkly" production. Lanksy continued to write that if "One More Sleep" fails to get listeners in the mood for Christmas, then "nothing" else would. Popjustice wrote that "One More Sleep" is "so incredible" that listeners forget that it is one of "the most toxic phrases in the English language", and awarded the song nine out of a possible ten stars. Michael Cragg, a writer for The Guardian, was complimentary of the song and wrote that it is worthy of ranking alongside Kelly Clarkson's Christmas song "Underneath the Tree" (Wrapped in Red) as 2013s "best song to get drunk to at a Christmas party." He praised the decision for "legendary" producer Richard Stannard to produce the song, as well as the Spector influence.

Chart performance
In the United Kingdom, "One More Sleep" debuted at number 34 on the UK Singles Chart on 8 December 2013, and surged to its peak position of number three the following week. Only 300 copies separated "One More Sleep" from attaining the number-two position, which was claimed by Avicii's "Hey Brother". With "One More Sleep" peaking inside the top five at number three on the UK Singles Chart, Lewis set a new record for British female solo artist with the most top five singles in the history of the chart, bringing her total to eight. "A Moment Like This" and "Bleeding Love" both reached number-one in 2006 and 2007, respectively. In 2008, the double A-side "Better in Time"/"Footprints in the Sand" peaked at number two, "Forgive Me" peaked at number five and "Run" peaked at number one. "Happy" peaked at number two in 2009, while "Collide" peaked at number four in 2011. As a result, Lewis overtook Olivia Newton-John's record tally of seven top five singles. Petula Clark, Shirley Bassey, Cilla Black, Billie Piper, Geri Halliwell, Louise Redknapp, Cheryl, Emeli Sandé, Jessie J and Ellie Goulding had all had achieved six top five singles as of December 2013. The song held onto its peak position of number three for a second week on the UK Singles Chart the following week. "One More Sleep" spent a further fourth week charting at number 15 before disappearing from the chart. In December 2014, the song re-entered the UK Singles Chart at number 80, and spent two further weeks at number 92. In December 2015, it re-entered the chart for one week at number 83. Altogether, "One More Sleep" has spent a total of two weeks in the top ten, three weeks in the top 20, four weeks in the top 40 and 75, and eight weeks in the top 100 of the UK Singles Chart.

On the UK Singles Downloads Chart, "One More Sleep" debuted at number 36 on 8 December 2013, and jumped to number two the following week. It slipped one position to number three in its third week, and number 14 in its fourth before falling off the chart altogether. The track re-entered the chart in December 2014 at number 93 and peaked at number 66 for two weeks. In December 2015, the song made another re-entry at number 61, and number 69 in December 2016. In December 2016, "One More Sleep" was certified silver by the British Phonographic Industry (BPI) for exceeding 200,000 shipments and streams.

For the week ending 7 December 2013, "One More Sleep" debuted at number 31 on the South Korea International Singles Charts, with first week sales of 4,266 copies. In the United States, the song debuted at number 16 on the Billboard Adult Contemporary chart on 9 December. It rose one position to number 15 in its second week, and to number 10 in its third week. It peaked at number 23 on the US Holiday Digital Songs chart. In Ireland, "One More Sleep" peaked at number 19. "One More Sleep" is ranked as the ninth most played Christmas song on radio in the UK in 2013.

"One More Sleep" entered the UK Top 40 again at number 36 on 15 December 2017. It then reached number 19 the week later, marking its first top 20 entry since December 2013. The song re-entered the UK Top 40 again in 2018, reaching number 19 on the week of 21st December. On the week of 28 December 2018 the song reached number 8, making its way back to the UK top 10.

In 2019, the song re-entered the UK top 40 once again  and reached number 15 on the week of 23 December. In 2020, the song re-entered the top 40 at position 33 for the week 4th December. The song climbed within the UK top 20, peaking at number 18. 

As of 03 December 2021 "One More Sleep" charted at 47, surpassing sales of 1,000,000 copies in the UK. On 31st December 2021, the song charted at number 20 in the UK, also charting at number 30 on the Irish Singles Chart.

Music video
The official music video for "One More Sleep" was uploaded to Leona's official VEVO account on 30 November 2013. Lewis's boyfriend Dennis Jauch appears in the video. Lewis said the video "came from an idea we did a little while ago where a camera crew came into the studio and shot me and my friend just kinda messing around and just in the studio being me". Michael Cragg from The Guardian wrote that it does not matter what happens in the music video, as he believes that no Christmas single has ever had a good video. However, he further wrote that Lewis had "ripped off" Wham!'s music video for "Last Christmas".

Live performances
Lewis embarked on a promotional tour across Europe prior to the album's release. On 9 November 2013, Lewis performed "One More Sleep" and "White Christmas" for the first time at the Regent Street Christmas lights switch-on event in London, England. Other musical performers included Passenger and Eliza Doolittle. On 22 November, Lewis gave a free concert in Zurich, Switzerland, at the NRJ Energy Stars for Free Festival in front of audience of 13,000 people. The following evening, Lewis performed a short set at London's G-A-Y nightclub.

In the United States, Lewis appeared on NBC's The Today Show on 4 December in New York City to talk about the album. On the same day, she performed at the Rockefeller Center Christmas Tree lighting event, where she performed "White Christmas", "One More Sleep" and "I Wish It Could Be Christmas Everyday". The following day on 5 December, Lewis made an appearance on Live! with Kelly and Michael. Lewis performed "One More Sleep" live at the semi-finals of the tenth series of The X Factor on 8 December and again on This Morning on 13 December.
Leona performed "I Wish It Could be Christmas Everyday" on The Jonathan Ross Show and "One More Sleep" at ITV's Daybreak. Lewis performed at The Tonight Show with Jay Leno, Billboard Studio Sessions and on The Today Show on 25 December. Also in the US, Leona appeared in NBA Promo for ABC and ESPN.

On 2 December 2018, Lewis joined Scarlet Lee to perform "One More Sleep", which would have been Scarlet's winner's song if she had won.

Formats and versions
Single release version
 "One More Sleep"  – 3:59

Streaming – Dance Remix
 "One More Sleep" (Cahill Remix)  – 3:47

Remixes – EP
 "One More Sleep"  – 4:01
 "One More Sleep" (Instrumental)  – 3:58
 "One More Sleep" (Cahill Club Mix)  – 6:07
 "One More Sleep" (Cahill Radio Edit)  – 3:47

Credits and personnel
Recording
Recorded and mixed at Biffco Studios, Brighton, and Angel Recording Studios, London.

Personnel

 Songwriting – Leona Lewis, Richard Stannard, Iain James, Jez Ashurst, Bradford Ellis
 Production – Richard "Biff" Stannard, Ash Howes
 Vocal production – Richard Stannard, Ash Howes, Leona Lewis
 Mixing – Richard Stannard
 Recording – Biffco, Ash Howes
 Keys and programming – Jez Ashurst, Richard Stannard, Ash Howes
 Celli – Nick Holland
 Drums – Freddy Sheed
 Brass – Knight Time Horns

 Trombone – Barnaby Dickinson
 Trumpet – Graeme Flowers
 Saxophone – James Knight
 Strings – Led by Rolf Wilson, arranged and conducted by Cliff Masterson, booked by Roz Colls
 Violins – Rolf Wilson, Simon Baggs, Steve Morris, Julian Leaper, Tom Piggot Smith, Richard George, Jonathan Hill, Laura Bruce White, Tim Grant, Reiad Chibah.
 Violas – Greg Walmsley, Nerys Richards.
 Background vocals – Katie Holmes, Kelli-Leigh Henry-Davila, Bianca Claxton
 Choir vocals – Diva singers (arranged and conducted by Cliff Masterson)

 
Credits adapted from the liner notes of Christmas, with Love. (Syco, Sony, RCA).

Charts

Weekly charts

Year-end charts

Certifications

References

2013 songs
Leona Lewis songs
Songs written by Leona Lewis
British Christmas songs
Songs written by Iain James
Songs written by Richard Stannard (songwriter)
2013 singles
Songs written by Jez Ashurst
Song recordings produced by Richard Stannard (songwriter)